Conestoga is an unincorporated community and census-designated place (CDP) in Conestoga Township, Lancaster County, Pennsylvania, in the United States. At the 2010 census the population was 1,258. The Conestoga post office serves ZIP code 17516.

History
Conestoga was first called "Conestoga Manor" by William Penn, founder of Pennsylvania. The name was derived from the Conestoga (Susquehannock) people, a peaceful tribe that adopted Christianity. Their principal village in the area was located nearby. In 1763 some 20 Conestoga were massacred by the Paxton Boys, who came across the Alleghenies to raid their settlement in a mistaken retaliation for other warfare. The few survivors fled the area. 

The town of Conestoga was laid out in 1797, after the American Revolutionary War, by John Kendig, Harry Breneman, Edward Charles, and John Folkman.

The headquarters of Turkey Hill Dairy, a food company specializing in iced teas and dairy products, has a Conestoga mailing address.

Geography
Conestoga is in southwest Lancaster County, in the eastern part of Conestoga Township. It is situated between the Conestoga River to the northwest and Pequea Creek to the southeast.

Demographics

Photo gallery

References 

Census-designated places in Lancaster County, Pennsylvania
Census-designated places in Pennsylvania